Bethlehem Area School District is a large public school district serving the city of Bethlehem and it surrounding boroughs of Fountain Hill and Freemansburg, and Bethlehem and Hanover townships across both Lehigh and Northampton Counties in the Lehigh Valley region of eastern Pennsylvania.

Bethlehem Area School District operates 22 schools: two high schools, four middle schools, and sixteen elementary schools. High school students attend Freedom High School in Bethlehem Township or Liberty High School in Bethlehem for grades nine through 12. Middle schools for grades five through eight include Broughal Middle School, East Hills Middle School, Nitschmann Middle School, and Northeast Middle School. Elementary schools for kindergarten through fourth grade include Asa Packer Elementary School, Calypso Elementary School, Clearview Elementary School, Donegan Elementary School, Farmersville Elementary School, Fountain Hill Elementary School, Fountain Hill Kindergarten Center, Freemansburg Elementary School, Governor Wolf Elementary School, Hanover Elementary School, James Buchanan Elementary School, Lincoln Elementary School, Marvine Elementary School, Miller Heights Elementary School, Spring Garden Elementary School, Thomas Jefferson Elementary School, and William Penn Elementary School. High school students may choose to attend the Bethlehem Area Vocational-Technical School for training in the construction and mechanical trades.

As of the 2021–22 school year, the school district had a total enrollment of 13,034 students between its 22 schools, according to National Center for Education Statistics data. 

According to 2000 federal census data, it served a resident population of 108,000. By 2010, the district's population increased to 116,968 people. The educational attainment levels for the Bethlehem Area School District population (25 years old and over) were 87.9% high school graduates and 30.5% college graduates. 

According to the Pennsylvania Budget and Policy Center, 49.9% of the district's pupils lived at 185% or below the federal poverty level as shown by their eligibility for the federal free or reduced price school meal programs in 2012. In 2013, the Pennsylvania Department of Education, reported that 285 students in the Bethlehem Area School District were homeless.

The Colonial Intermediate Units IU20 provides the district with a wide variety of services like: specialized education for disabled students; state mandated training on recognizing and reporting child abuse; speech and visual disability services; criminal background check processing for prospective employees and professional development for staff and faculty.

Schools

High schools
Freedom High School, Bethlehem Township
Liberty High School, Bethlehem

Middle schools
Broughal Middle School
East Hills Middle School
Nitschmann Middle School
Northeast Middle School

Elementary schools
Asa Packer Elementary School
Calypso Elementary School
Clearview Elementary School
Donegan Elementary School
Farmersville Elementary School
Fountain Hill Elementary School
Fountain Hill Kindergarten Center
Freemansburg Elementary School
Governor Wolf Elementary School
Hanover Elementary School
James Buchanan Elementary School
Lincoln Elementary School
Marvine Elementary School
Miller Heights Elementary School
Spring Garden Elementary School
Thomas Jefferson Elementary School
William Penn Elementary School

Athletics
Both Bethlehem Area School District high schools compete in the Eastern Pennsylvania Conference. Bethlehem high schools also have an ice hockey team that is one of eleven Lehigh Valley-area high school teams that compete in the Lehigh Valley Scholastic Ice Hockey League.

References

External links

Bethlehem Area School District on Facebook
Bethlehem Area School District on Twitter 

School districts in Lehigh County, Pennsylvania
School districts in Northampton County, Pennsylvania